M:FANS is the sixteenth solo studio album by Welsh musician and composer John Cale. It was released in January 2016 on the Double Six Records imprint of Domino Recording Company. Produced by Cale, it features new versions of songs from his 1982 album Music for a New Society. "Close Watch" was the album's lead single. It was released in November 2015 and features Amber Coffman from Dirty Projectors.

Background
In a statement Cale recounted the process of making the album, and how the 2013 death of former bandmate and collaborator Lou Reed had informed it:
Losing Lou [too painful to understand] forced me to upend the entire recording process and begin again...a different perspective - a new sense of urgency to tell a story from a completely opposite point of view - what was once sorrow, was now a form of rage. A fertile ground for exorcism of things gone wrong and the realization they are unchangeable. From sadness came the strength of fire!!!

Accolades

Track listing
All tracks composed by John Cale; except where indicated.
"Prelude" – 2:17
"If You Were Still Around" (Cale, Sam Shepard) – 5:18
"Taking Your Life in Your Hands" – 5:43
"Thoughtless Kind" – 5:27
"Sanctus (Sanities Mix)" – 5:19
"Broken Bird" – 5:10
"Chinese Envoy" – 3:51
"Changes Made" – 3:54
"Library of Force" – 3:09
"Close Watch" – 5:15
"If You Were Still Around (Choir Reprise)" (Cale, Shepard) – 4:44
"Back to the End" – 3:34

Personnel

John Cale – vocals, voice, noises, keyboards, organ, piano, electric piano, guitar, electric guitar, programmed guitar, bass, programming, synthesizer, drums, viola, samples, production, recording, mixing
Dustin Boyer – guitar, guitar synthesizer, bass, loops, programming, drum machine, drum programming, drums, mixing, recording
Deantoni Parks – keyboards, noises, loops
Joey Maramba – synth bass
Ralph Esposito – synth bass
Alex Thomas – drums, samples
Matt Fish – cello 
Miguel Atwood-Ferguson – viola
Thomas Lea – viola
Jessy Greene – violin
Chris Bautista – trumpet
Amber Coffman – vocals on "Close Watch"
New Direction Church – choir
Benjamin Goodman – choir director
William Arthur George Cale – voice
Margaret Cale – voice
Technical
Adam Moseley – mixing, recording
Nita Scott – mixing, executive producer

Charts

References 

John Cale albums
Albums produced by John Cale
2016 albums
Double Six Records albums